Police Athletic League Stadium (PAL Stadium) is a stadium located in San Jose, California owned by the SJ division of the Police Athletic League, the stadium seats 5,000. It is home to Real San Jose of the National Soccer League.

Soccer venues in California
Sports venues in San Jose, California
National Premier Soccer League stadiums